Sir Harry Hope, 1st Baronet (24 September 1865 – 29 December 1959) was a Scottish Unionist politician.

Hope sat as member of parliament (MP) for Buteshire from 1910 to 1918, Stirlingshire and Clackmannan Western from 1918 to 1922, and Forfar from 1924 to 1931. In 1932 he was created a Baronet, of Kinnettles in the County of Angus.

References

External links 
 

1865 births
1959 deaths
Members of the Parliament of the United Kingdom for Scottish constituencies
Unionist Party (Scotland) MPs
UK MPs 1910–1918
UK MPs 1918–1922
UK MPs 1924–1929
UK MPs 1929–1931
Baronets in the Baronetage of the United Kingdom
Members of the Parliament of the United Kingdom for Stirling constituencies